Leptobasis is a small genus of damselflies in the family Coenagrionidae. They are commonly known as swampdamsels.
The genus is neotropical and one species, L. melinogaster, has been recorded in Texas. They are slender and the females have very long ovipositors.

The genus contains the following species:

Leptobasis buchholzi 
Leptobasis candelaria  - Caribbean swampdamsel
Leptobasis guanacaste 
Leptobasis linda 
Leptobasis lucifer  - Lucifer swampdamsel
Leptobasis mauffrayi 
Leptobasis melinogaster  -  cream-tipped swampdamsel
Leptobasis raineyi 
Leptobasis vacillans  - red-tipped swampdamsel

References

Coenagrionidae
Zygoptera genera
Taxa named by Edmond de Sélys Longchamps
Taxonomy articles created by Polbot